Krasnoye is a rural locality (a selo) in Seletskoye Rural Settlement, Suzdalsky District, Vladimir Oblast, Russia. The population was 82 as of 2010. There are 7 streets.

Geography 
Krasnoye is located on the Nerl River, 5 km east of Suzdal (the district's administrative centre) by road. Troitsa-Bereg is the nearest rural locality.

References 

Rural localities in Suzdalsky District